Phosphoribosyl-N-formylglycineamide (or FormylGlycinAmideRibotide, FGAR) is a biochemical intermediate in the formation of purine nucleotides via inosine-5-monophosphate, and hence is a building block for DNA and RNA. The vitamins thiamine and cobalamin also contain fragments derived from FGAR.

FGAR is formed when the enzyme phosphoribosylglycinamide formyltransferase adds a formyl group from 10-formyltetrahydrofolate to glycineamide ribonucleotide (GAR) in reaction :
GAR + 10-formyltetrahydrofolate → FGAR + tetrahydrofolate
The biosynthesis pathway next converts FGAR to an amidine by the action of phosphoribosylformylglycinamidine synthase, transferring an amino group from glutamine and giving 5'-phosphoribosylformylglycinamidine (FGAM) in a reaction that also requires ATP:
FGAR + ATP + glutamine + H2O → FGAM + ADP + glutamate + Pi

See also
 5-Aminoimidazole ribotide
 Purine metabolism

References

Nucleotides